Ecsenius polystictus, known commonly as the dotted coralblenny or Andaman combtooth-blenny, is a species of combtooth blenny in the genus Ecsenius. It is found in the eastern Indian ocean, around Indonesia. It can reach a maximum length of 4 centimetres. Blennies in this species feed primarily off of plants, including benthic algae and weeds.

References
 Springer, V. G. and J. E. Randall 1999 (6 Dec.) Ecsenius polystictus, new species of blenniid fish from Mentawai Islands, Indonesia, with notes on other species of Ecsenius. Revue française d'Aquariologie Herpétologie v. 26 (no. 1-2): 39–48.

polystictus
Fish described in 1999
Taxa named by Victor G. Springer
Taxa named by John Ernest Randall